The French invasion of the Isle of Wight occurred during the Italian Wars in July 1545. The invasion was repulsed.

France had a long history of attacking the Isle of Wight, and the 1545 campaign proved to be the last time to date that the French have attempted to take it. Although the French forces, led by Claude d'Annebault, greatly outnumbered those of the English, the battles fought (including the battles of the Solent and Bonchurch) ended without a clear winner. However, as the French were repelled, it could be considered an English victory. Although the operation was inconclusive, the English suffered heavily, including the loss of the carrack Mary Rose in the Battle of the Solent. Details of the conflict have not been very well recorded, and some accounts claim that the French were defeated at each battle rather easily.

French strategy was to effect a landing at Whitecliff Bay and cross Bembridge Down to attack Sandown, and another landing at Bonchurch with a view to marching to link up at Sandown. The northern force was intercepted whilst crossing the Down, but fought its way to Sandown Castle, which was then under construction offshore. The southern force, meanwhile, was routed at St Boniface Down. Both forces were repulsed after stiff fighting. 

The Chronicle of Charles Wriothesley (died 1562) reports: "The 21 day of July the French galleys and navie came before Portesmouth haven, and landed certeine of theyre armye in the Yle of Wyght, and there burned and camped there about to the nomber of 2,000 men, and came every tyde with theyr gallies and shott their ordinaunce at the Kinges ships in the haven; but the winde was so calme that the Kinges shippes could bear noe sayle, which was a great discomfort for them." Three days later a muster of 1500 men was sent from the City of London to repel them, but by the King's command turned back at Farnham, the French having left the Isle of Wight "and divers of them slaine and drowned".

Contemporary accounts suggest that the French (or their mercenaries) sacked the area in order to provoke the English fleet into battle against a far larger fleet. Martin Du Bellay wrote: "To keep the enemy's forces separated, a simultaneous descent was made in three places. On one side Seigneur Pierre Strosse was bidden to land below a little fort where the enemy had mounted some guns with which they assailed our galleys in flank, and within which a number of Island infantry had retired. These, seeing the boldness of our men, abandoned the fort and fled southwards to the shelter of a copse. Our men pursued and killed some of them and burned the surrounding habitations".

A later mention by Sir John Oglander evidently paraphrases du Bellay: "They landed at three several places at one time, purposely to divide our forces. Pierre Strosse landed at St Helens where there was a little fort, and beat our men, being divided from the fort, into the woods. Le Seigneur de Tais, General of the Foot, landed at Bonchurch, where there was a hot skirmish between them and us, and on either party many slain."

The French seem to have landed at undefended points and then attacked defences from inland. At Whitecliff Bay and at Bonchurch they moved swiftly to seize the high ground. However, the attacks were expected and in both cases local forces reached the high grounds to oppose them. The settlement at Nettlestone and its manor were burnt.

At Bonchurch the French landed easily at Monk's Bay, but were then faced with the difficulty of breaking out from what is known descriptively as the "Undercliff". The defenders thus had them at a considerable advantage, having taken up positions on the top of the hill.

The plaque at Seaview
The event is commemorated by a plaque in Seaview which reads:

The veracity of this account has been challenged, on the grounds that there were few if any local inhabitants, the militia may have been sent from the mainland, the numbers involved are uncertain, and the last invasion of Britain was the Battle of Fishguard in 1797—although 'Britain' was merely a geographical term in 1545.

References

External links
Official website of the Isle of Wight
Memorial plaque
Isle of Wight Historical Review

French invasion of the Isle of Wight (1545)
Military history of the Isle of Wight
Invasions of England
Campaigns of the Italian Wars
Conflicts in 1545
Military campaigns involving France
16th century in Hampshire
Isle of Wight
France–United Kingdom military relations
England–France relations
Italian War of 1542–1546